The Sample News Group, LLC, is an American publisher of newspapers serving suburban and rural markets in Pennsylvania, New Jersey, Vermont, New York, and New Hampshire.  The company is family owned and is structured as a Pennsylvania limited liability corporation and is headquartered in Corry, Pennsylvania.

History 
The Sample News Group was founded by George Raymond Sample, Jr. (1924–2008).  As of 2017, George "Scoop" Sample (né George Raymond Sample III; born 1952), one of eight children of George Sample, is listed as President.  The Biddle family – namely two sons of Joseph Franklin Biddle, publishers John Hunter Biddle (1905–1977) and successor Joseph Franklin Biddle II (born 1936) – former publisher The Daily News of Huntingdon, Pennsylvania, sold The Joseph F. Biddle Publishing Company to The Sample News Group on October 21, 1991.  The Sample News Group is also actively managed by George Sample's wife, Marlene Sample (aka "Sissie" Kane; née Marlene Sue Kane; born 1951).

Selected holdings 
The Sample News Group, as of 2020, owns the following:

Daily newspapers 

 Barre Montpelier Times Argus,, Barre, Vermont
 Bedford Gazette, Bedford, Pennsylvania
 Corry Journal, Corry, Pennsylvania
 The Daily Herald, Tyrone, Pennsylvania
 The Daily News, Huntingdon
 The Daily Review, Towanda, Pennsylvania
 The Eagle-Times, Claremont, New Hampshire
 The Gettysburg Times, Gettysburg, Pennsylvania
 Indiana Gazette,  Indiana, Pennsylvania
 Latrobe Bulletin, Latrobe, Pennsylvania
 The Morning Times, Sayre, Pennsylvania
 The News-Item, Shamokin, Pennsylvania
 The Palladium Times, Oswego, New York
 Rutland Herald, Rutland, Vermont
 Standard Journal, Milton, Pennsylvania

Weekly newspapers 

 Cape May Star and Wave, Cape May, New Jersey
 The Dispatch, Portage, Pennsylvania 
 The Journal, Nanty Glo, Pennsylvania
 Mainline Extra, Ebensburg, Pennsylvania
 The Mainliner, Cresson, Pennsylvania
 Mountaineer-Herald, Ebensburg, Pennsylvania
 Ocean City Sentinel, Ocean City, New Jersey
 The Star-Courier, Northern Cambria, Pennsylvania
 Sure Guide, Ocean City, New Jersey

Other publications 

 Argus Champion, Newport, New Hampshire
 Broad Top Bulletin, Broad Top, Pennsylvania
 North East News-Journal, North East, Pennsylvania
 Pennsylvania Business Central, State College, Pennsylvania
 Philipsburg Journal, Philipsburg, Pennsylvania
 Shippensburg News-Chronicle, Shippensburg, Pennsylvania
 The Valley Log, Orbisonia, Pennsylvania
 The Valley News, Fulton, New York
 The Valley Times-Star, Newville, Pennsylvania

References 

Newspaper companies of the United States
Publishing companies established in 2000